The Alabama State Senate is the upper house of the Alabama Legislature, the state legislature of the U.S. state of Alabama. The body is composed of 35 members representing an equal number of districts across the state, with each district containing at least 127,140 citizens. Similar to the lower house, the  Alabama House of Representatives, the Senate serves both without term limits and with a four-year term.

The Alabama State Senate meets at the State House in Montgomery.

Like other upper houses of state and territorial legislatures and the United States Senate, the Senate can confirm or reject gubernatorial appointments to the state cabinet, commissions and boards.

Assembly powers
While the House of Representatives has exclusive power to originate revenue bills, such legislation can be amended and/or substituted by the Senate. Moreover, because the Senate is considered to be the "deliberative body", rules concerning the length of the debate are more liberal than those of the House of Representatives.

Like the United States Senate, the Alabama State Senate has the sole power of Confirmation of certain appointees designated by the Constitution and by statute. The legislative antecedent of this role is a similar power that was vested in the Roman Senate during the Roman Republic.

Membership guidelines
The Alabama State Senate is composed of 35 state senators, in keeping with Article IV, Section 50, of the Alabama Constitution, which limits the Alabama House of Representatives to 105 members, and the Senate to 35; together with Article IX, Sections 197 and 198, which requires that membership in the state senate consist of not less than one-fourth, nor more than one-third, of the total membership of the state House of Representatives. Additional representation is authorized in the event of the creation of new counties. Thus, the Alabama State Senate is precisely one-third the size of the House of Representatives, and each state senator represents a district of approximately 125,000 Alabamians.

Under Article IV, Section 47 of the Constitution, Senators must be at least 25 years of age at the time of their election, must be citizens and residents of the state of Alabama for at least 3 years, and reside within their district for at least one year prior to election.

Senators, like members of the House of Representatives, are elected for four-year terms and take office at midnight of the day of their election. Amendment 97 to the Constitution, provides that should a vacancy occur in either house of the Legislature, the governor is required to call a special election to fill the vacancy.

Composition

Senate Leadership

Majority leadership

Minority leadership

List of State Senators

Past composition of the Senate 
Throughout most of the state's history, the Democratic Party controlled the Alabama State Senate from the time of admission to the Union in 1819 with a few brief exceptions.  The Whig Party had a majority in the State Senate in 1837 and again from 1850 to 1851.  Following the Civil War and the state's readmission to the Union, the chamber had a Republican majority during the Reconstruction period from 1868 to 1874.  This was followed by 136 consecutive years of Democratic majorities.  Beginning with the 2010 election Republicans captured a substantial majority in the chamber and have held it in the two elections since in 2014 and 2018.

The first African-American to serve in the Alabama State Senate was Benjamin F. Royal, a Republican from Bullock County, who served from 1868 to 1875.  The election of 1983 produced the first female senators in Alabama history as Republican Ann Bedsole (1983-1995) and Democrat Frances "Sister" Strong (1983-1986) won office.

Leadership of the Senate
The Lieutenant Governor of Alabama serves as the President of the Senate, but only casts a vote if required to break a tie. In his or her absence, the President Pro Tempore presides over the Senate. The President Pro Tempore is elected by the full Senate by nominations taken from the floor, followed by a recorded vote. The President Pro Tempore is the chief leadership position in the Senate. The other Senate Majority and Minority leaders are elected by their respective party caucuses.

The president of the Senate is the Lieutenant Governor, which is currently Will Ainsworth. The president pro tempore is Greg Reed. The majority leader is Republican Clay Scofield and the minority leader is Democrat Bobby Singleton.

Committees
Current committees include:

Senate seal
The Senate Seal features an open book and torch, accompanied by the Latin phrase Libertas Per Lege, meaning "Liberty Through Law". The official Seal of the Senate was adopted by Senate Resolution, August 19, 1965, and was created by a special committee consisting of then Senators John Tyson (Mobile), Vaughan Hill Robison (Montgomery), Bill Nichols (Talladega), Lieutenant Governor Jim Allen and Secretary of the Senate McDowell Lee.

See also
 Government of Alabama

References

External links
 Alabama State Senate official government website
 Project Vote Smart – State Senate of Alabama

 
Senate
State upper houses in the United States
Politics of Alabama